Superman: Countdown to Apokolips is a platform video game developed by Canadian studio Mistic Software and published by Infogrames, released under the Atari brand name for Game Boy Advance. It was based largely on Superman: The Animated Series, including its character portrayals, and artistic style. There are bosses such as Livewire, Metallo and Bruno Mannheim, as well as goons and other items. Development started life at the Crawfish Interactive Studios.

Plot
The game serves as a prequel to the events of Superman: Shadow of Apokolips. Agents of Darkseid comes to Earth to bring down the Man of Steel. Meanwhile, a villain named Kalibak kidnaps Lois Lane, and Livewire, Metallo, and Bruno Mannheim has just broke out of prison.

Gameplay
The game plays from an isometric perspective. Superman is able to fly across levels, and he can use his heat vision and iceblasts. Superman can also punch and kick his enemies to the ground.

Reception

The game has received mixed-to-negative reviews. It has a score of 45% from GameRankings and 47 out of 100 from Metacritic. Much of the criticism focused on repetitive gameplay, but the graphics were praised.

References

External links
 

2003 video games
Atari games
Game Boy Advance games
Game Boy Advance-only games
Countdown to Apokolips
Video games based on adaptations
Video games developed in Canada
Video game prequels
Superhero video games
Video games set in the United States
Single-player video games